Namio (written: 南雄 or ナミオ in katakana) is a masculine Japanese given name. Notable people with the name include:

 (born 1943), Japanese golfer

Japanese masculine given names